Porcellio granuliferus is a species of woodlouse in the genus Porcellio belonging to the family Porcellionidae that is endemic to mainland Spain.

References

Crustaceans described in 1885
Endemic fauna of Spain
Porcellionidae
Woodlice of Europe